The 1963–64 Intertoto Cup was won by Slovnaft Bratislava who retained the trophy they had won the previous season, defeating Polonia Bytom in the final. The tournament was expanded for this season, with 48 clubs entering compared to 32 in previous years, including the first clubs from Belgium to play in the Intertoto Cup - this meant an additional knock-out round was added between the Group Stage and the Quarter-Finals.

Teams location

Group stage 
The teams were divided into twelve groups of four clubs each. The groups were divided geographically as 'A', for Belgium, France, Italy and Switzerland; 'B' for Austria, the Netherlands, Sweden and West Germany; and 'C' for Czechoslovakia, East Germany, Poland and Yugoslavia. The twelve group winners (shown in bold in the tables below) advanced to the knock-out rounds - where clubs from each of the three zones, 'A' 'B' and 'C', were kept apart.

Group A1

Group A2

Group A3

Group A4

Group B1

Group B2

Group B3

Group B4

Group C1 

The Sosnowiec v Jena match was abandoned after Jena ended up with too few players (due to injuries and sendings-offs), the score at the time was allowed to stand.

Group C2

Group C3

Group C4

First round 
 The best two losing teams also qualified for the Quarter-finals - they were Modena (3–4) and Örgryte (1–2).

Quarter-finals 

1 Odra Opole progressed to the Semi-finals on a coin toss.

Semi-finals

Final 
Played over 1 leg, in Vienna (neutral venue).

See also 
 1963–64 European Cup
 1963–64 UEFA Cup Winners' Cup
 1963–64 Inter-Cities Fairs Cup

External links 
 Intertoto Cup 1963–64 by Karel Stokkermans at RSSSF
  by Pawel Mogielnicki

UEFA Intertoto Cup
Europa